Quarto (abbreviated Qto, 4to or 4º) is the format of a book or pamphlet produced from full sheets printed with eight pages of text, four to a side, then folded twice to produce four leaves. The leaves are then trimmed along the folds to produce eight book pages. Each printed page presents as one-fourth size of the full sheet.

The earliest known European printed book is a quarto, the Sibyllenbuch, believed to have been printed by Johannes Gutenberg in 1452–53, before the Gutenberg Bible, surviving only as a fragment. Quarto is also used as a general description of size of books that are about 12 inches (30 cm) tall, and as such does not necessarily indicate the actual printing format of the books, which may even be unknown as is the case for many modern books. These terms are discussed in greater detail in book sizes.

Quarto as format

Each leaf of a quarto book thus represents one fourth the size of the original sheet. Each group of 4 leaves (called a "gathering" or "quire") could be sewn through the central fold to attach it to the other gatherings to form a book. Sometimes, additional leaves would be inserted within another group to form, for example, gatherings of 8 leaves, which similarly would be sewn through the central fold. Generally, quartos have more squarish proportions than folios or octavos.

There are variations in how quartos were produced. For example, bibliographers call a book printed as a quarto (four leaves per full sheet) but bound in gatherings of 8 leaves each a "quarto in 8s."

The actual size of a quarto book depends on the size of the full sheet of paper on which it was printed.

The earliest surviving books printed by movable type by Gutenberg are quartos, which were printed before the Gutenberg Bible. The earliest known one is a fragment of a medieval poem called the Sibyllenbuch, believed to have been printed by Gutenberg in 1452–53. Quartos were the most common format of books printed in the incunabula period (books printed before 1501). The British Library Incunabula Short Title Catalogue currently lists about 28,100 different editions of surviving books, pamphlets and broadsides (some fragmentary only) printed before 1501, of which about 14,360 are quartos, representing just over half of all works in the catalogue.

Quarto as size

Beginning in the mid-nineteenth century, technology permitted the manufacture of large sheets or rolls of paper on which books were printed, many text pages at a time. As a result, it may be impossible to determine the actual format (i.e., number of leaves formed from each sheet fed into a press). The term "quarto" as applied to such books may refer simply to the size, i.e., books that are approximately 10 inches (250 mm) tall by 8 inches (200 mm) wide.

Quartos for separate plays and poems 

During the Elizabethan era and through the mid-seventeenth century, plays and poems were commonly printed as separate works in quarto format. Eighteen of Shakespeare's 36 plays included in first folio collected edition of 1623, were previously separately printed as quartos, with a single exception that was printed in octavo. For example, Shakespeare's Henry IV, Part 1, the most popular play of the era, was first published as a quarto in 1598, with a second quarto edition in 1599, followed by a number of subsequent quarto editions. Bibliographers have extensively studied these different editions, which they refer to by abbreviations such as Q1, Q2, etc. The texts of some of the Shakespeare quartos are highly inaccurate and are full of errors and omissions. Bibliographer Alfred W. Pollard named those editions bad quartos, and it is speculated that they may have been produced not from manuscript texts, but from actors who had memorized their lines.

Other playwrights in this period also published their plays in quarto editions. Christopher Marlowe's Doctor Faustus, for example, was published as a quarto in 1604 (Q1), with a second quarto edition in 1609. The same is true of poems, Shakespeare's poem Venus and Adonis being first printed as a quarto in 1593 (Q1), with a second quarto edition (Q2) in 1594.

See also
Book size
Bookbinding
Folio
Octavo
Early texts of Shakespeare's works
English Renaissance theatre

References

Sources
 McKerrow, R. (1927) An Introduction to Bibliography for Literary Students, Oxford University Press: Oxford.

Book formats